This is a summary of notable incidents that have taken place at various Universal-owned theme parks, amusement parks, or water parks. This list is not intended to be a comprehensive list of every such event, but only those that have a significant impact on the parks or park operations, or are otherwise significantly newsworthy.
 
The term incidents refers to major accidents, injuries, or deaths that occur at a Universal park.  While these incidents were required to be reported to regulatory authorities due to where they occurred, they usually fall into one of the following categories:
Caused by negligence on the part of the guest.  This can be refusal to follow specific ride safety instructions, or deliberate intent to violate park rules.
The result of a guest's known, or unknown, health issues.
Negligence on the part of the park, either by ride operator or maintenance. 
Act of God or a generic accident (e.g. slipping and falling), that is not a direct result of an action on anybody's part.

Universal Orlando

Universal's Islands of Adventure

Dudley Do-Right's Ripsaw Falls

On January 1, 2011, a major fire broke out on the attraction's show building. The ride and the park's Toon Lagoon area were evacuated. No injuries were reported.

Dueling Dragons/Dragon Challenge

 On July 1, 2009, an employee was walking underneath the Dueling Dragons coaster in a restricted area when he was hit by a train during a test run. The victim suffered multiple head injuries and was taken to nearby Orlando Regional Medical Center and then later died.
 On July 31, 2011, a tourist was injured when an unidentified object hit him in the eye while riding Dragon Challenge. Prior to the incident, the guest had only one good eye, therefore the incident resulted in the guest completely losing his sight. Dragon Challenge remained shut for less than 24 hours after the incident with Universal concluding that the ride was safe.
On August 10, 2011, a rider was struck by an object while riding the attraction, injuring his face and leg. As a result of this and the aforementioned incident in which a rider lost sight in one eye, Universal officials announced that the two roller coasters would no longer operate simultaneously, pending an investigation into both incidents. In October 2011, officials suspended the dueling aspect of the ride permanently.

Hagrid's Magical Creatures Motorbike Adventure

On October 2, 2019, the park temporarily shut down the ride after a swarm of honey bees surrounded the whole area of the attraction. It reopened later that evening.

Skull Island: Reign of Kong

On December 10, 2016, a 38-year-old tourist from Guatemala felt ill after riding the attraction. He sat down on a bench while his family continued their visit to the park. When his family returned, they found him dead. Two years later in 2018, a lawsuit was filed against the park stating that none of the signs used for the attraction were in Spanish.
 On May 16, 2021, a woman's index finger was severely cut during mid-ride, and had to be partially amputated as a result.

The Incredible Hulk Coaster

 On September 23, 2003, a 34-year-old woman from Jensen Beach, Florida, suffered a heart attack from an unknown heart condition while riding The Incredible Hulk coaster. She was rushed to Sand Lake Hospital in critical condition, but never regained consciousness and died shortly after being taken off of life support.

VelociCoaster

 Not long before the ride's grand opening, park guests were banned from the park after throwing ice at one of the ride's trains.
 On July 9, 2021, a 28-year-old woman was arrested after fighting in the ride's queue line.

Halloween Horror Nights 

 On October 28, 2015, two guests were arrested and charged with battery for attacking "scare actors" during the Halloween Horror Nights event. Two scare actors quit after the attacks.

Universal Studios Florida

Parkwide incidents
On September 30, 2016, at around 10:00 a.m. local time, a "catastrophic" failure knocked out power to the entire Universal Studios Florida theme park. Park employees were able to evacuate riders from most attractions, but the Orlando Fire Department was called in to assist with some evacuations from the Men in Black: Alien Attack and Transformers attractions. However, two rides managed to remain in operation during the outage: Harry Potter and the Escape from Gringotts and The Simpsons Ride. Initial reports did not indicate a cause of the failure, but the adjacent Universal's Islands of Adventure park was unaffected.

E.T. Adventure

On October 15, 1996, a 28-year-old man from Casselberry, Florida fell 10 to 12 feet from the ride's platform while trying to step into the vehicle. He was taken to Orlando Regional Medical Center and treated for his injuries.
On January 31, 2019, an 11-year-old boy visiting from Brazil was injured when his foot became wedged between the ride's unloading platform and a vehicle, breaking multiple bones in the process. Due to this incident, the attraction has changed its operational procedures.

Hogwarts Express
On October 1, 2016, a man and a 14-year-old girl were injured when an e-cigarette exploded on the ride.

Hollywood Rip Ride Rockit

 On August 1, 2013, an unidentified woman received minor injuries when the ride came to a sudden stop.

Jaws

In July 1990, a 39-year-old man from Sicklerville, New Jersey fell into the water after a piece of the queue line's railing broke. He then sued the park for $1 million, claiming that the company and its park employees were negligent with maintaining the ride.

Men in Black: Alien Attack

 On January 8, 2004, an 11-year-old boy's foot became wedged between the ride vehicle and the loading platform and was taken to Orlando Regional Medical Center to be treated for his injuries. A park spokesperson claimed that there was no evidence the accident might have been caused by a malfunction, but the attraction remained closed for further inspection before it was deemed safe for it to reopen again.
 On November 8, 2016, emergency crews were summoned to the attraction at around 2:30 a.m. to attend to a maintenance worker who had no pulse. The worker was found in the rafters of the attraction building. The worker was declared dead, but no cause of death was revealed, although park officials did state that the ride itself was not involved.

Revenge of the Mummy

He suffered injuries to his head and noted pain due to the fall. He was rushed to Orlando Regional Medical Center for surgery and died the next day.
 On September 23, 2004, a 67-year-old woman was injured when her arm became stuck between a handrail. The ride was temporarily shut down following an investigation and continued to resume normal operational hours after it was deemed safe.
 On November 18, 2007, a 34-year-old woman broke a vertebra in her lower back while riding the attraction.

The Simpsons Ride

 On June 13, 2008, guests in one ride vehicle were sprayed with a nontoxic substance described as a "derivative of vegetable oil". No injuries were reported, and the guests were given a change of clothes and allowed to shower at the property.  The park identified the source of the oil but were not able to determine the cause of the incident, and the unaffected ride vehicles remained open.

Universal's Horror Make-Up Show
In August 2002, a woman was pulled from the audience to participate in the show. After being frightened by one of the on-stage monsters, the woman fell off the stage in fear. She landed head first on the steps of the theater and also lost consciousness. She was taken to the hospital, where she was treated and released.

Woody Woodpecker's Nuthouse Coaster

 On June 19, 2006, a 4-year-old girl injured one of her feet while exiting the train. She was taken to the hospital to be treated for cuts on her foot. Reports said that the girl's foot got stuck between the train and platform. Her foot was freed, but Universal closed the coaster so that staff could examine the ride. The attraction reopened the next day on June 20.

Universal CityWalk Orlando

 On April 22, 2011, a 33-year-old man from Winter Haven, Florida, was found unconscious in front of the Universal Cineplex 20 theater after being tased by an off-duty police officer due to disorderly conduct. The man was taken to Dr. P. Phillips Hospital and later died.

Universal Studios Hollywood

Backlot fires

Nine backlot fires have occurred at Universal's backlot throughout the park's history. For more information see Universal Studios Hollywood backlot fires.

Backdraft

On July 11, 1996, during a performance, a pyrotechnic display accidentally triggered a powerful sprinkler system which burst into flames. A total of 145 audience members were sprayed by water sourced from its sewage pipe although no injuries were reported soon after the incident occurred.

Backlot Tour
 On April 6, 2016, a tram collided with a sign that was protruding onto the roadway. Injured passengers were treated at the scene.

Construction incidents
On November 28, 1986, two workers were riding on a bucket from a 30,000 pound crane until they were thrown off after it fell through a plywood floor which suddenly collapsed. Both were taken to St. Joseph Medical Center where one died from suffering head and chest injuries while the other was treated for only minor injuries sustained in the accident.

Despicable Me: Minion Mayhem

On April 3, 2015, a man fatally shot himself in a designated smoking area near the Despicable Me attraction. His weapon had not been detected by park security because, at the time, guests were not required to pass through metal detectors upon entering the park.
On June 1, 2021, a fire broke out behind the Minion Mayhem show building. The fire broke out at around 11:45 p.m. while the attraction was closed for renovation. The fire was quickly brought under control and was extinguished without causing any injuries. Coincidentally, the incident occurred exactly thirteen years after the infamous 2008 backlot fire.

E.T. Adventure

On February 17, 1992, a 9-year-old girl injured her leg while stepping in front of a moving platform.

Guest accidents
On November 17, 2008, one of the escalators from inside the park malfunctioned and threw eight people off it. The guests were taken to the hospital, all suffering minor injuries.

Jurassic Park: The Ride

On June 29, 1996, a week after the attraction officially opened to the public, a malfunction occurred, spraying more than 100 passengers with hydraulic fluid. Four people were sent to Mullikin Medical Center with minor injuries.
On August 9, 1996, seven passengers suffered injuries when two boats collided into each other.
On November 30, 1998, a 45-year-old woman from Northridge, California was awarded $90,000 in a lawsuit after being injured while riding the attraction. The boat stopped on a steep incline which jerked her back and forth from her seat and suffered neck injuries sustained in the accident.

Universal CityWalk Hollywood

At 1:15 a.m. on May 12, 2014, a suspect was fatally shot by Los Angeles Police Department officers at Universal CityWalk. Officers were called to a fight in a crowd at a club. A man was seen carrying a gun outside the club who was promptly shot to death by police. Two civilians were injured while running away, but none of them from gunfire.

Halloween Horror Nights

 On October 31, 1986, during the "Fright Nights" event, scare actor Paul Rebalde Brooks, who was supposed to scare the attendees at The Terror Tram (a nighttime version of the Backlot Tour), fell between two of the tram cars and was crushed to death by a tram. Universal Studios Hollywood put Halloween events on hiatus until six years later, when their "Halloween Horror Nights" debuted in 1992.

Power outage
On April 26, 2022, in a statement, a spokesperson for Universal Studios Hollywood said the park experienced a "brief power dip which resulted in exiting guests from some attractions", due to a "power interruption" from the utility Southern California Edison. Power was fully restored, the statement said. No injuries reported.

Waterworld

 On January 23, 2023, a stunt performer was hospitalized after an incident during the park's Waterworld show. Paramedics were immediately called to the attraction where they performed CPR on the unresponsive victim before transporting him to a local hospital. A park spokesperson declined to address further information regarding how the incident unfolded or what the victim's condition was.

Universal Studios Japan

E.T. Adventure

In November 2004, a 35-year-old woman from Osaka Prefecture, Japan, got her hand stuck in a safety bar as an employee pulled it down to secure it. The woman suffered nerve damage in her right wrist, resulting in the loss of use of two of her fingers and, ultimately, losing her job. The woman sued the park and received an out-of-court settlement in 2006.

Volcano Bay

Puihi
On August 23, 2017, a 13-year-old girl from New Jersey suffered a head injury while riding the Puihi water slide at the park. She fell out of the raft and was trapped underneath it and nearly drowned. The girl was unable to stand up on her own after being rescued from the water and was taken to Arnold Palmer Hospital for Children for treatment and recovered. Almost a year later, on April 16, 2018, her family filed a lawsuit against the park.

Other incidents
On December 27, 2018, a 26-year-old man from South Carolina allegedly molested a 10-year-old girl while they were on Kopiko Wai Winding River. He was arrested by the police and was also charged with lewd and lascivious behavior for molesting a child under the age of 12.
On June 2, 2019, multiple employees were sent to the hospital after experiencing electrical shocks. The park closed early and reopened the next day.
On June 14, 2020, a 9-year-old boy was found unresponsive after coming down the Kala and Tai Nui body slides. He was hospitalized and released the next day.

References

Universal Parks & Resorts
Universal Parks